is a series of action role-playing games created by Hidetaka Miyazaki of FromSoftware and published by Bandai Namco Entertainment. The series began with the release of Dark Souls (2011) and has seen two sequels, Dark Souls II (2014) and Dark Souls III (2016). Dark Souls has received critical acclaim, with the first title often cited as one of the greatest in video games, with the series as a whole being both praised and criticized for its high level of difficulty. 

By 2022, the series had shipped over 33 million copies. Other FromSoftware games, including Demon's Souls, King's Field, Bloodborne, Sekiro, and Elden Ring, share several related concepts and are commonly grouped together as Soulsbornes.

Setting
The games take place within a dark, medieval fantasy setting, where the player's character fights against knights, dragons, phantoms, demons, and other monstrous or supernatural entities. The accretion, loss, and recovery of souls are central to the narrative and gameplay of Dark Souls games. These games are linked through their setting and an overarching cyclic narrative centering around fire, and are linked through common themes and elements, including interactions with phantoms and battles with demons. At the end of each game, characters may reignite the "first flame" or allow it to fade, recurring a choice others have made before.

Gameplay

The Dark Souls games are played in a third-person perspective, and focus on exploring interconnected environments while fighting enemies with weapons and magic. Players battle bosses to progress through the story, while interacting with non-playable characters. The protagonist of each Dark Souls game can have a varying gender, appearance, name, and starting class via character creation. Players can choose between classes, including knights, barbarians, thieves, and mages. Each class has its own starting equipment and abilities that can be tailored to the player's experience and choices as they progress. The player gains souls from gameplay battles which act as both experience points to level up and as currency to buy items. Souls gained are usually proportional to the difficulty of fighting certain enemies; the more difficult an enemy, the more souls the player will gain from defeating it.

One of the core mechanics of the series is that it uses death to teach players how to react in hostile environments, encouraging repetition, learning from past mistakes, and prior experience as a means of overcoming its difficulty. Upon losing all of their health points and dying, players lose their Souls and are teleported back to a bonfire where they last rested, which serves as a checkpoint. One chance is given for the player to recover their lost Souls in the form of a bloodstain, which is placed at or around where they last died. If the player dies again before reaching their bloodstain, the Souls are permanently gone. As most enemies are respawned following player death, or if the player should rest at a bonfire, the player has the opportunity to regain more Souls by repeated combat encounters. The bonfire is a type of campfire in the action role-playing game Dark Souls and its sequels that functions as a checkpoint for the player character's progress, as well as reviving most enemies that the player previously killed. Later in the game, and in Dark Souls II and III, they function as warp points. Another core aspect of the series is its dependency on endurance in battle. Performing attacks, blocking, or dodging consume stamina, which otherwise quickly restores if the player stands still or just walks around. Certain moves cannot be executed if the player lacks a certain amount of stamina, making them vulnerable to attack. Players must balance their rate of attacks against defensive moves and brief periods of rest to survive more difficult encounters.

Online interaction in the Dark Souls is integrated into the single-player experience. Throughout levels, players can briefly see the actions of other players as ghosts in the same area that may show hidden passages or switches. When a player dies, a bloodstain can be left in other players' game world that when activated can show a ghost playing out their final moments, indicating how that person died and potentially helping the player avoid the same fate in advance. Players can leave messages on the ground that can either help other players by providing hints and warnings or harm them by leaving false hints. Players can also engage in both player versus player combat and cooperative gameplay using invasion or summoning mechanics.

Games

Dark Souls

Dark Souls is the first game in the series; it is considered a spiritual successor to Demon's Souls (2009). FromSoftware wanted to develop a sequel to Demon's Souls, but Sony's ownership of the intellectual property prevented them from doing so on other platforms. It was released in 2011 for PlayStation 3 and Xbox 360. In 2012, Dark Souls: Prepare to Die Edition was released for Windows, PlayStation 3, and Xbox 360, featuring the base game and the Artorias of the Abyss downloadable content. The game takes place in the fictional kingdom of Lordran. Players assume the role of a cursed human character who sets out to discover the fate of undead humans like themselves. The plot of Dark Souls is primarily told through environmental details, in-game item flavor text, and dialogue with non-playable characters (NPCs). Players must piece together clues in order to understand the story, rather than being told the story through more traditional means, such as through cutscenes. Dark Souls and its predecessor Demon's Souls garnered recognition due to the series' high level of difficulty. A version featuring some graphical and gameplay enhancements, Dark Souls: Remastered, was released in May 2018.

Dark Souls II

Unlike the previous two games, director Hidetaka Miyazaki did not reprise his role as he was busy directing Bloodborne, although he was still involved in supervision. It was released in 2014 for Windows, PlayStation 3, and Xbox 360. In 2015, an updated version featuring The Lost Crowns downloadable content was released for Windows, PlayStation 3, Xbox 360, PlayStation 4, and Xbox One, under the title Dark Souls II: Scholar of the First Sin - with the latter two platforms receiving retail releases. The game takes place in the kingdom of Drangleic, where the player must find a cure for the undead curse. Although set in the same universe as the previous game, there is no direct story connection to Dark Souls.

Dark Souls III

Dark Souls III was released in 2016 for Windows, PlayStation 4, and Xbox One. The gameplay is paced faster than previous Souls installments, which was attributed in part to the gameplay of Bloodborne. The game takes place in the kingdom of Lothric, where the player must end the cycle of linking the Flame. In 2017, the complete version containing the base game and both expansions (Ashes of Ariendel and The Ringed City) was released, under the title Dark Souls III: The Fire Fades Edition. Dark Souls III was both critically and commercially successful, with critics calling it a worthy and fitting conclusion to the series. It sold over 10 million copies by 2020, making it the fastest-selling game in Bandai Namco's history at the time (until it was overtaken by Elden Ring). In 2015, Miyazaki said that Dark Souls III would likely be the last of the series, with FromSoftware choosing to move onto new games of unrelated IPs in the future.

Other media

A comic book by Titan Comics based on the series debuted alongside the release of Dark Souls III in 2016. A Kickstarter campaign for a licensed board game by Steamforged Games, Dark Souls – The Board Game, was also announced around the same time. The campaign was funded within the first three minutes of its launch and was released in April 2017. 

Dark Souls – The Board Game (2017) is a combat-centric miniatures game for 1-4 players. From tabletop gaming publisher, Steamforged Games, Dark Souls™: The Board Game emulates the video game in its challenging difficulty and has sold over 500,000 copies worldwide. Now (2022) two new core sets for Dark Souls™: The Board Game have been released, each visiting iconic locations from the video game - Tomb of Giants & The Painted World of Ariamis.  

In February 2017, music from the series composed by Motoi Sakuraba was performed by a live orchestra at the Salle Pleyel concert hall in Paris. In September of that year, a limited edition vinyl box set containing the soundtracks of all three games was released in Europe. In Japan, a box set containing the enhanced versions of all three games for the PlayStation 4, the soundtracks for each, bookends, artwork prints, and dictionaries detailing every in-game item was released on May 24, 2018.

Related games

Demon's Souls

Released in 2009 for the PlayStation 3, Demon's Souls is considered the spiritual predecessor to the Dark Souls series. It has also been described as a spiritual successor to the King's Field series of games, while at the same time being described as a separate entity "guided by differing core game design concepts." It also drew inspiration from video games such as Ico, The Legend of Zelda, and FromSoftware's Otogi: Myth of Demons, as well as manga such as Berserk, Saint Seiya and JoJo's Bizarre Adventure.

Unlike its successors, Demon's Souls uses a central hub system known as the "Nexus" where players can level up, repair equipment, or buy certain items, before venturing into one of the five connected worlds. The "World Tendency" feature is also exclusive to Demon's Souls, where the difficulty of exploring a world is dependent on how many bosses have been killed, and how the player dies. The gameplay involves a character-creation system and emphasizes gathering loot through combat with enemies in a non-linear series of varied locations. It had an online multiplayer system integrated into single-player, in which players could leave messages and warnings for other players' worlds, as well as join other players to assist and/or kill them. The multiplayer servers were shut down in early 2018 due to inactivity.

King's Field 
The King's Field series, also developed by FromSoftware, is considered a spiritual predecessor to the series. It debuted in 1994 with King's Field for the PlayStation and had three sequels.

Other 
In February 2016, Bandai Namco Entertainment partnered with American retailer GameStop to release Slashy Souls, a free-to-play mobile endless runner, to promote Dark Souls III. The game was presented in a pixel art style, and shares the series' level of difficulty. The game was met with highly negative critical reception, with reviewers such as Chris Carter of Destructoid and Jim Sterling both giving the game a 1/10.

Reception

The Dark Souls series has been met with critical acclaim. The first Dark Souls has been cited to be among the greatest video games of all time, Dark Souls II also received critical acclaim upon release. Before release, Dark Souls III was one of the most anticipated games of 2016, and also received critical acclaim upon release.

The "bloodstain" gameplay mechanic has been given praise by critics. David Craddock of Shacknews called them one of the core tenets of the series. He stated that the harshest punishment one can receive in a Souls game is "not dying once, but twice." GamesRadar+ called bloodstains, in combination with Demon Souls's message system, "a graceful, elegant way of letting players guide each other without the need for words", and said that "rarely has the price of failure been balanced on such a precarious knife edge" as being forced to retrieve one's bloodstain.

The bonfire concept was similarly praised. Matthew Elliott of GamesRadar+ called bonfires a powerful symbol of relief, and "a meaty cocktail of progress, exhaustion and joy", and that, while other games evoke emotions with their save points, no other game does so as effectively. Vice called the Bonfire a "mark of genius" that "reinvented the save point" and allowed the player to reflect on their progress.

Sales and legacy
The Dark Souls series had shipped 33.4 million copies outside of Japan . Dark Souls III broke sales records upon release, selling over three million copies worldwide by May 2016 and was Bandai Namco's fastest-selling game until being surpassed by Elden Ring in 2022.

The Soulslike genre was inspired by common features of the series, resulting in many games using similar mechanics. Other FromSoftware games directed by Miyazaki, such as Demon's Souls, Bloodborne, Sekiro: Shadows Die Twice, and Elden Ring, share many of the same concepts of Souls and are often associated with the series and grouped under the "Soulsborne" label.

The series has also been cited as an influence on several PlayStation Network features, including asynchronous messaging, social networking, and video sharing, as well as for the television show Stranger Things.

Notes

References

 
Action role-playing video games
Video game franchises
Video game franchises introduced in 2011
Video games adapted into comics
Bandai Namco Entertainment franchises